The International Secretariat of Potters was a global union federation bringing together trade unions representing workers making tiles and related items for the construction industry.

The federation was established in 1907, on the initiative of Adam Drunsel, of the German Central Union of Potters.  It dissolved in 1922, its members instead joining the International Federation of Building Workers.

Affiliates
At of 1921, the federation's members were:

References

Global union federations
Trade unions established in 1907
Trade unions disestablished in 1922
Ceramics and pottery trade unions